Maksim Igorevich Shevchenko (born 27 March 1980) is a Kazakhstani professional football coach and a former player. He works as a deputy director at the academy of the Russian club Lokomotiv Moscow. He also holds Russian citizenship.

Club career
He made his professional debut in the Russian Premier League in 1997 for FC KAMAZ-Chally Naberezhnye Chelny. He played 2 games in the 2001–02 UEFA Cup for FC Chernomorets Novorossiysk.

Career statistics

International goals

References

External links
Maksim Shevchenk at Footballdatabase

1980 births
Living people
Kazakhstani footballers
Kazakhstan international footballers
Russian Premier League players
FC KAMAZ Naberezhnye Chelny players
FC Chernomorets Novorossiysk players
FC Lada-Tolyatti players
FC Tobol players
FC Kairat players
FC Shakhter Karagandy players
FC Kyzylzhar players
Russian expatriate sportspeople in Kazakhstan
Association football midfielders
Kazakhstani football managers
FC Neftekhimik Nizhnekamsk players
FC Nosta Novotroitsk players